Faifi is a possible Old South Arabian language spoken by about 50,000 people in the vicinity of Mount Faifa (Jebel Fayfa) in the southwestern corner of Saudi Arabia, and across the border in Jebel Minabbih, Yemen. Along with Razihi, it is possibly the only other possible surviving descendant of the Old South Arabian branch of Central Semitic.

Speakers 
Faifi is spoken in an area of roughly 600 km² (232 m²) along the Saudi border known as Jabal Fayfa by some estimated 50,000 people primarily living in the upper part of the mountains. Until 35 years ago no major roads entered Jabal Fayfa and thus it is speculated that speakers of the language older than 60 may be monolingual while younger speakers of the language have tended to take up speaking varieties of Hejazi, Nejdi, and Standard Arabic alongside their own language due to prolonged contact with Arabic language media, education, etc. Education in Jabal Fayfa tends to be bilingual due to the difficulties students experience while attempting to learn in Standard Arabic and this has kept Faifi from being excluded from classrooms. Many Faifi-speakers leave Jabal Fayfa for educational and work related prospects and thus it is speculated they normally do not transmit their language to their children born outside of the native speech area. Because of such it is suggested that Faifi is an endangered language. Many speakers will code-switch to known varieties of Arabic so as to avoid negative remarks and stigmatization.

Faifi-speakers have historically enjoyed a sustained degree of independence due to the terrain they inhabit, similar to the peoples of Jabal Minabbih across the border, and thus many of the effects of modernity were experienced later in the region. Because of this certain concessions made when integrating Jabal Fayfa into Saudi Arabia it remains an area exempt of the otherwise country-wide illegality of Qāt (Catha edulis). Much like the tribes of Jabal Razih the tribes of Jabal Fayfa belong to the Ḫawlan bin ʾAmir parent-tribe hence why Ḫawlāniya (IPA: /xawlaːnija/) has become a popular colloquial name for Faifi and neighboring speech varieties.

Classification 
The classification of Faifi is a topic of great interest since it was first considered to not be a dialect of Arabic. While most discussions of the language cover only the speech variety found in Jebel Fayfa, it has been suggested that the speech variety across the border in Jabal Minabbih is the same language and this would mean that Faifi is spoken on both sides of the Saudi-Yemeni border and encompasses more than just the speech varieties which are the most well documented. In the ISO change request regarding the language it was noted by linguist Michael Ahland himself said that he was "completely convinced that Faifi is an independent language" but did not know what language it could possibly  be a dialect of given that it is exceedingly unlike the neighboring Arabic speech varieties. The discussion of Faifi as a Sayhadic language is not well studied, and although plausible it is fair to stay on the side of caution given that no definitive comparative study has been conducted between Faifi and any known Sayhadic language, including neighboring Razihit. An air of caution can be found in Lowry (2020) when Faifi is discussed, noting that while some authors jump to claim Faifi as a descendant of a Sayhadic language (more broadly "Himyaritic") Watson (2018) does make the argument that Faifi and Razihit both may be amongst numerous speech varieties in this area that could be holdouts of this long assumed to be extinct branch of Central Semitic.

Phonology 
The consonant inventory of Faifi is as follows according to both Alfaifi & Behnstedt (2010), Alfaife (2018) and Alaslani (2017); allophones are in parentheses and phonemes attested only in Alaslani (2017) are in brackets:

The following features should be noted regarding consonant inventory of Faifi:

 The phoneme /ðˤ/ is attested in both the Upper and Lower dialects as a variant of [θˤ] and is suspected to be a byproduct of contact with Arabic. In the Upper variety of Faifi the phoneme is typically pronounced as /f/ or /θ/ while both the pharyngealization and place of articulation is preserved in the Lower dialect and in Minnabih.
 The phoneme /t͡s/ appears to be a variation of the phoneme [t͡ʃ] in the Upper dialect although it can vary between speakers; it is [t͡ʃ] in both Minabbih and the Lower dialect. The phoneme [t͡ʃ] is a reflex of both historical *k and *ɮˤ in both areas, similar to Razihi.
 Alfaifi & Behnstedt (2010) describes the phoneme /ʃ/ as apical-alveolar in the Lower dialect and apical-palatal in the Upper dialect, while in Minabbih it is pronounced as [ç] by some speakers. Behnstedt originally described it as a sound similar to a retroflexed ich-Laut, which he later clarifies as incorrect.
 The phoneme /d͡ʒ/ is a dialectal variation of [ʒ].
 Faifi is well known for having the segment /st/ as a reflex of historical *sˤ in environments where the phoneme is not restricted from this change. While Behnstedt & Alfaifi (2010) assume that this reflex is evidence towards an earlier affricate *t͡sˤ a more recent thesis, Alfaifi (2022), claims that in the Central dialect of Faifi it is demonstrable that this reflex is bisegmental and hence may be the result of a loss of emphasis.
The vowel phonemes of Upper Faifi per Alfaife (2018) are as follows:

The following should be noted regarding the vowel phonemes of Upper Faifi:

 The phonemes /i/, /a/, /u/ become [ɪ], [ə], [ʊ] in closed syllables with the schwa being present as well at the end of words if there is an absolute pause, otherwise the /a/ is maintained.
 The status of the long vowel /uː/ is unclear being that it is not reported to be phonemically contrastive with /u/; the phoneme can only appear in the first open syllable of a word in a closed syllable word medially.
 In contrast to Razihi, Faifi in all of its varieties maintains the diphthongs /aj/ and /aw/ but has a tendency towards monophthongization such as in the words /t͡ʃeːf/ 'how?' (Minabbih) and /θoːbin/ 'gown' (Faifi).

References

Old South Arabian languages
Languages of Saudi Arabia